Nicole Vaidišová was the defending champion, but did not compete this year.

First-seeded Marion Bartoli won the title by defeating Aiko Nakamura 2–6, 6–2, 6–2 in the final.

Seeds

Draw

Finals

Top half

Bottom half

References
 Main and Qualifying Draws

2006 Japan Open Tennis Championships